Alpendorada, Várzea e Torrão is a civil parish in the municipality of Marco de Canaveses, Portugal. It was formed in 2013 by the merger of the former parishes Alpendurada e Matos, Várzea do Douro and Torrão. The population in 2011 was 8,485, in an area of 16.82 km².

References

Freguesias of Marco de Canaveses